The New Zealand women's national beach handball team is the national team of New Zealand. It takes part in international beach handball competitions.

World Championships results
2010 – 12th place

References

External links
Official website
IHF profile

Women's national beach handball teams
Women's national sports teams of New Zealand